St. Maries Masonic Temple No. 63, also known as St. Maries Masonic Lodge No. 63,  is an historic Masonic building located at 208 S. 8th Street in St. Maries, Idaho. On September 23, 2011, it was listed on the National Register of Historic Places.

St. Maries Masonic Lodge No. 63 is still active and holds stated meetings on the third Thursday of the month.

See also

 List of National Historic Landmarks in Idaho
 National Register of Historic Places listings in Benewah County, Idaho

References

External links
 Image of St. Maries Masonic Lodge at flickr

Buildings and structures in Benewah County, Idaho
Clubhouses on the National Register of Historic Places in Idaho
Masonic buildings in Idaho
National Register of Historic Places in Benewah County, Idaho